Nico Thomaschewski (born 10 February 1971 in Berlin) is a retired German footballer who played as a goalkeeper for BFC Dynamo from 1999 until the opening of the insolvency proceedings in 2001 and then from 2002 to 2011. He has spent almost his entire career in Berlin, apart from six months with SV Babelsberg 03 from Potsdam in Brandenburg. Thomaschewski has played in a total of 317 matches for BFC Dynamo during his career and is thus one of the most capped players of the club.

References

External links

1971 births
Living people
German footballers
Association football goalkeepers
1. FC Union Berlin players
Tennis Borussia Berlin players
Berliner FC Dynamo players
SV Babelsberg 03 players
Berliner FC Dynamo managers
2. Bundesliga players
Footballers from Berlin
German footballers needing infoboxes
German football managers
People from East Berlin